Strictamine is an alkaloid isolated from Alstonia scholaris.

Because of its unusual chemical structure, it has attracted research interest and several laboratory syntheses have been reported.

References

Tryptamine alkaloids
Quinolizidine alkaloids
Indoloquinolizines